Aphloia is a genus of flowering plants that contains a single species, Aphloia theiformis, the sole species of the monogeneric family Aphloiaceae. It is a species of evergreen shrubs or small trees occurring in East Africa, Madagascar, the Mascarene Islands and the Seychelles.

Taxonomy 
The genus Aphloia was described by John Joseph Bennett in 1840 and included in Flacourtiaceae, where most authors continued to include it until Armen Takhtajan recognized its misplacement and created the new family Aphloiaceae in Violales to accommodate it. In 2003 the APG II system included Aphloiaceae in the Rosids without specifying an order. Matthews & Endress (2005) and Stevens (2006) include the family in an enlarged order Crossosomatales. The APG III system of 2009 followed suit and includes Aphloiaceae within the Crossosomatales.

Description 
Young branches are hairless, brown in colour, have stripes along their length and wings extending from the nodes, narrowing downwards and carries alternately set leaves in two rows. There are some ten pairs of inconspicuous, papery and hairless side veins. The individual flowers have an undifferentiated perianth that consists of four or five, rarely six, slightly leathery, white, later yellowish, oval to round, concave tepals of 2½-3½ mm (0.10–0.14 in) in diameter, interlocked with each other at their foot.

References 

 (full text )
Matthews, M. L. and P. K. Endress. 2005. Comparative floral structure and systematics in Crossosomatales (Crossosomataceae, Stachyuraceae, Staphyleaceae, Aphloiaceae, Geissolomataceae, Ixerbaceae, Strasburgeriaceae). Botanical Journal of the Linnean Society 147: 1-46 (abstract).
Aphloiaceae in Stevens, P. F. (2001 onwards). Angiosperm Phylogeny Website. Version 7, May 2006.
Aphloia in Flora of Zimbabwe (includes photo)

Flora of Madagascar
Monotypic rosid genera
Crossosomatales
Plants described in 1794
Flora of the Mascarene Islands
Flora of Seychelles